Potter Pond (formerly Fish Pond) is a saltwater pond in the town of South Kingstown, Washington County, Rhode Island, United States. Its tidal inlet connects to Point Judith Pond. It is one of nine coastal lagoons, referred to as "salt ponds" by locals, in southern Rhode Island.

See also

List of lakes in Rhode Island
Geography of Rhode Island

References

Lagoons of Washington County, Rhode Island
Saline lakes of the United States
South Kingstown, Rhode Island